Nikos Boutzikos (born 6 September 1989) is a Greek professional footballer who plays for Super League 2 club Olympiacos Volos, for which he is captain.

Career
Boutzikos is a product of Panathinaikos' youth team, and before being scouted by the club he played amateur football for clubs in Chalkidiki.

On 25 January 2007, Boutzikos signed a 5-year professional contract with Panathinaikos. Boutzikos made his first team debut for the club in a post-season play-off match against AEK on 14 May 2008.

References

External links
Profile at Insports.gr

Panthracrocs

1989 births
Living people
Greek footballers
Greece youth international footballers
A.O. Kerkyra players
Panthrakikos F.C. players
Association football defenders
Panathinaikos F.C. players
Doxa Drama F.C. players
Panegialios F.C. players
Olympiacos Volos F.C. players
Apollon Smyrnis F.C. players
Panachaiki F.C. players
People from Polygyros
Footballers from Central Macedonia